Peter Edward Ellson (21 August 1925 – 14 April 2014) was an English professional footballer who played as a goalkeeper.

Career
After playing for Crewe Railway Police, Ellson joined Crewe Alexandra in May 1949. He made 219 appearances in the Football League for Crewe, and 234 appearances in all competitions. He left Crewe in April 1956, and played non-league football for Runcorn.

References

1925 births
2014 deaths
English footballers
Crewe Alexandra F.C. players
Runcorn F.C. Halton players
English Football League players
Association football goalkeepers